Keppel MRT station is a future underground Mass Rapid Transit (MRT) station on the Circle line, located in Bukit Merah planning area, Singapore. This station is part of Stage 6 of the Circle line (CCL6) which will "close the circle" between the HarbourFront and Marina Bay stations. The station will be located along Keppel Road, near to the Keppel Harbour. Slated for completion by 2026, Keppel station will serve the upcoming Greater Southern Waterfront.

First announced in 2015, construction of the station began in 2017. The station was to be opened in 2025 along with the other CCL6 stations, but was delayed to 2026 due to the COVID-19 pandemic in Singapore.

History

On 29 October 2015, the station was first officially announced as part of the Stage 6 of the Circle line. Construction began at the end of 2017, with expected completion in 2026.

On 25 July 2019, tunnelling works for the CCL6 started with the launch of the Tunnel Boring Machine at Keppel station. The TBM will tunnel from Keppel to the existing CCL HarbourFront station.

Station details

Location
Situated along Keppel Road, the station will serve the Downtown Core and Keppel Distripark.

Design
The station will have a unique landscape theme; an undulating green roof (with tree-like columns) in a natural setting. It was planned to have an underground bicycle park, providing cyclists direct access to the concourse.

References

External links

Bukit Merah
Mass Rapid Transit (Singapore) stations
Railway stations scheduled to open in 2026